Ivanhoe East is a suburb of Melbourne, Victoria, Australia, 10 km north-east from Melbourne's Central Business District, located within the City of Banyule local government area. Ivanhoe East recorded a population of 3,762 at the 2021 census.

In the 12-month period to January 2020 Ivanhoe East reported a median house price of A$1.58 million for a three bedroom house.

History

Charterisville was built in about 1840, of sandstone quarried on the site, for David Charteris McArthur, Melbourne's first bank manager. Following his death in 1887 part of the house was leased to artist Walter Withers. Charterisville became an important centre and artists' colony within the Heidelberg School. Ravenswood was begun in 1891 for financier Robert William Kennedy on four acres of land rising from the north side of Lower Heidelberg Road. The house is architecturally significant as a fine example of a Renaissance Revival mansion. Ivanhoe East Post Office opened on 1 November 1939.

Today

Lower Heidelberg Road is considered to be the suburb's centre, which hosts a strip of retail stores. Although only a small area, Ivanhoe East has its own church, newsagent, fruit store, butcher, milk bar, supermarket, bakery and community bank. It also boasts a range of speciality stores.

According to a 2010 analysis by property research company, R.P. Data, Ivanhoe East is the most tightly held residential housing market in Australia, with residents holding on to their properties for an average of 16 years, compared with overall greater Melbourne and Sydney hold periods of 9.6 years and 8 years respectively. Over that 16-year period between May 1994 and May 2010 median house prices within Ivanhoe East have increased from A$250,000 to A$1.25 million, representing an annual average growth rate of approximately 10.6%. As at December 2010 the median house price in Ivanhoe East (for the 12 months to November 2010) was approximately A$1.4 million.

In a separate article The Age notes that "there is no shortage of trees and parkland in Ivanhoe with large blocks, waterways and hilly vistas as trademarks of the area. Yet even with all its green charm, the suburb is just a 15-minute drive from the CBD and is classed as zone 1 for train travel".  The Ivanhoe East area "blending into Eaglemont" is specifically described as "the area's more exclusive pocket" with "its own dedicated shopping village, which is much quieter than the strip shopping on Upper Heidelberg Road in Ivanhoe central".

Well regarded residential streets within the Ivanhoe East area include; The Boulevard and surrounding tree-lined streets such as Wallis Avenue, Otterington Grove, Hardy Terrace; Keam and Streeton on the Yarra River side, as well as properties within the Beauview Estate Heritage Overlay Precinct such as York, King and Beauview Parade.

Public library service is provided by Yarra Plenty Regional Library. The nearest library is in Ivanhoe.

Education
One primary school is located in the Ivanhoe East area: Ivanhoe East Primary School, a public school, located on Warncliffe Road, and backing onto Robin Hood Rd, just south of Lower Heidelberg Road. It comprises the main school as well as a middle school for years 2 and 3 on the site of the former Mother of God primary school, which closed in 2017.

Religion
 Roman Catholic Church. The parish of Ivanhoe covers the district along with the neighbouring districts of Ivanhoe and Heidelberg. There are three churches in the parish: the Church of Mary, Mother of God at Robin Hood Road, Ivanhoe East; the Church of Mary Immaculate, Waverley Avenue, Ivanhoe; the Church of St Bernadette, 89 Bond Street, Ivanhoe West.
 Anglican Church. The parish church of St George is located at Warncliffe Road.

Notable Locals
Wilbur Wilde

See also
City of Heidelberg – Ivanhoe East was previously within this former local government area.

References

External links
Neighbourhoods: You’ll never want to leave Ivanhoe East 4 March 2016
Ravenswood
Ivanhoe Amateur Football Club - Home of the Ivies!
Melbourne’s most popular suburbs for families
Ivanhoe East Victorian Places
Austral Piano World
Floral Impressions by Kathleen Farrell - Award Winning Florist

Suburbs of Melbourne
Suburbs of the City of Banyule